Thomas Huse was an American attorney and politician from Newburyport, Massachusetts.

Early life
Huse was born in Newburyport on June 28, 1851. He attended Newburyport public schools and the Dummer Academy. After school he became an attorney at law.

Political career
From 1877 to 1879, Huse was a member of the Newburyport Common Council. In 1897 he was a member of the Board of Aldermen. He served as Mayor from 1899 to 1900. From 1904 to 1905, Huse represented the 22nd Essex district in the Massachusetts House of Representatives.

On December 4, 1907, Huse was nominated to be the Collector of Customs for the Newburyport District. He was confirmed by the United States Senate on December 10, 1907. Huse initially declined the position, but changed his mind and accepted on December 31. In 1909, Huse received only $6.70 in compensation due to the lack of collections made in the port. He tendered his resignation, however no desirable person was willing to accept the position. On August 5, 1910, the United States Treasury Department eliminated the district. Huse was appointed a deputy collector at an annual salary of $300 and ordered to report to the Boston Collector.

From 1910 to 1913, Huse served as Newburyport's Fire Chief.

References

1851 births
19th-century American politicians
20th-century American politicians
American fire chiefs
Collectors of the Port of Newburyport
Massachusetts lawyers
Republican Party members of the Massachusetts House of Representatives
Mayors of Newburyport, Massachusetts
Year of death missing
The Governor's Academy alumni